Basketball club Lavera was a basketball club located in Kaunas, Lithuania. It was founded in 1991 and participated in the first two seasons of the Lithuanian Basketball League. Despite the club's success, Lavera dissolved in 1995 due to financial issues.

Season by season

Detailed information of former rosters and results.

References

Basketball teams in Lithuania
Sport in Kaunas
1991 establishments in Lithuania
Basketball teams established in 1991